The European Association for Chinese Studies (EACS) is an international scholarly association representing China scholars from Europe. It was founded in 1975 and is registered in Paris. The Association is governed by a Board and its daily activities are managed by its president, secretary-general, and treasurer.

EACS Conferences 
Conferences have been held biennially since 1976. The EACS holds a four-day conference devoted to planned programs of scholarly papers, roundtable discussions, workshops, and panel sessions on a wide range of issues in research and teaching.With over 600 presenting participants in over 150 panels in Leipzig in 2021, it is one of the greatest conferences on Chinese Studies worldwide.
 2024 (scheduled) - 25th biennial conference of the European Association for Chinese Studies (EACS), Tallinn
 2022 - 24th biennial conference of the European Association for Chinese Studies (EACS), Olomouc
2021 - 23rd biennial conference of the European Association for Chinese Studies (EACS), Leipzig
 2018 - 22nd biennial conference of the European Association for Chinese Studies (EACS), Glasgow
 2016 - 21st EACS Conference, St Petersburg
 2014 - 20th EACS Conference, Braga
 2012 - 19th EACS Conference, Paris
 2010 - 18th EACS Conference, Riga ("Culture is a Crowded Bridge")
 2008 - 17th EACS Conference, Lund
 2006 - 16th EACS Conference, Ljubiljana
 2004 - 15th EACS Conference, Heidelberg
 2002 - 14th EACS Conference, Moscow: “Chinese Traditional Civilization and the Contemporary World”
 2000 - 13th EACS Conference, Turin (Torino): “The Spirit of the Metropolis”
 1998 - 12th EACS Conference, Edinburgh: “Festivals - the Chinese at Work and at Play”
 1996 - 11th EACS Conference, Barcelona: “China and the Outer world”
 1994 - 10th EACS Conference, Prague (Praha): “Genius loci: Place, Region, and Chinese Region-alism”
 1992 - 9th EACS Conference, Paris: “Change-ment et idées de changement en Chine”
 1990 - 8th EACS Conference, Leiden
 1988 - 7th EACS Conference, Weimar
 1986 - 6th EACS Conference, Turin (Torino)
 1984 - 5th EACS Conference, Tübingen: “China - Present and Past“
 1982 - 4th EACS Conference, Cambridge
 1980 - 3rd EACS Conference, Zürich: “China: Continuity and Change”
 1978 - 2nd EACS Conference, Ortisei - St. Ulrich: “Understanding Modern China: Problems and Methods”
 1976 - 1st EACS Conference, Paris: “Popular and Official Traditions in China”

The conferences replaced the annual Junior Sinologues Conferences that had been taking place since 1948:
 1972 - 24th JS Conference, Leiden (Noordwijkerhout)		
 1971 - 23rd JS Conference, Oxford		
 1970 - 22nd JS Conference, Stockholm		
 1969 - 21st JS Conference, Senegallia / Marcerata 		
 1968 - 20th JS Conference, Prague [cancelled]		
 1967 - 19th JS Conference, Bochum		
 1966 - 18th JS Conference, Copenhagen-Humblebaek		
 1965 - 17th JS Conference, Leeds		
 1964 - 16th JS Conference, Bordeaux		
 1963 - 15th JS Conference, Torino		
 1962 - 14th JS Conference, Breukelen-Nijenrode		
 1961 - 13th JS Conference, Hamburg 		
 1960-	Moscow [cancelled]
 1959 - 12th JS Conference, Cambridge		
 1958 - 11th JS Conference, Padua and Venice 	
 1957 - 10th JS Conference, Marburg 	
 1956 - 9th JS Conference, Paris 	
 1955 - 8th JS Conference, Leiden (Oud-Poelgeest)		
 1954 - 7th JS Conference, Durham 		
 1953 - 6th JS Conference, Rome 		
 1952 - 5th JS Conference, Cologne (Köln-Wahn) 	
 1951 - 4th JS Conference, Paris 	
 1950 - 3rd JS Conference, London		
 1949 - 2nd JS Conference, Leiden	
 1948 - 1st JS Conference, Cambridge, London, and Oxford

Journal 
Since 2020, the Association has published a scholarly journal annually. The Journal of the European Association for Chinese Studies is an "open-access and peer-reviewed journal that fosters academic discussion and exchange on China- and Chinese-related topics. It is organized and financed by the European Association for Chinese Studies (EACS)".

See also
Braga Incident

References

External links
Official website

Organizations established in 1975
Pan-European learned societies
Research institutes of Sinology